The Oulujoki Church is an evangelical Lutheran church in Kirkkokangas neighbourhood in Oulu, Finland.

The wooden church, named the Church of the Holy Spirit, was built for the former Oulu rural municipality in 1907–1908. It was designed in the Art Nouveau style by architect .

The Art Nouveau interior of the Oulujoki church was modernized in the 1950s, but the new look did not please people and it was restored in the mid–1980s.

References

External links 
 
  

Lutheran churches in Oulu
Wooden churches in Finland
Churches completed in 1908
Art Nouveau church buildings in Finland
1908 establishments in Finland
20th-century churches in Finland
20th-century Lutheran churches